FC Chkalovets-Olimpik Novosibirsk was a Russian football team from Novosibirsk. It played professionally in the Russian Second Division from 2000 to 2003. Their best result was 6th place in the East Zone in 2000.

External links
  Team history by footballfacts

Association football clubs established in 1999
Association football clubs established in 2008
Defunct football clubs in Russia
Sport in Novosibirsk
1999 establishments in Russia
2008 establishments in Russia